Shirley Cotton (17 October 1934 – 11 July 2022) was an Australian athlete. She competed in the women's discus throw at the 1956 Summer Olympics.

References

External links
 

1934 births
2022 deaths
Athletes (track and field) at the 1956 Summer Olympics
Australian female discus throwers
Olympic athletes of Australia
Place of birth missing
20th-century Australian women
21st-century Australian women